Johannes Hermanus van der Hoop (29 March 1887 in Groningen – 11 October 1950) was a Dutch psychiatrist,

Van der Hoop underwent analysis with both Carl Jung and Ruth Mack Brunswick. He was a co-founder and president of the Dutch Association for Psychotherapy. In 1929 van der Hoop was given a private lectureship in the theory of neuroses at the University of Amsterdam.

Works
 Character and the unconscious: a critical exposition of the psychology of Freud and of Jung, 1921. Translated from the Dutch by Elizabeth Trevelyan. The International Library of Psychology, Philosophy and Scientific Method.
 Conscious orientation: a study of personality types in relation to neurosis and psychosis, London: Kegan Paul, Trench, Trubner & Co., 1939. Translated by Laura Hutton from the German Bewusstseinstypen und ihre Beziehung zur Psychopathologie (1937).

References

External links
 

1887 births
1950 deaths
Psychotherapists
Dutch psychiatrists
People from Groningen (city)
Leiden University alumni
Academic staff of the University of Amsterdam
Analysands of Ruth Mack Brunswick